The 2010–11 Austrian National League season was contested by eight teams, and saw VEU Feldkirch win the championship. The top four teams from the regular season qualified for Group A of the placing round. The bottom four teams took part in Group B. All four teams from Group A qualified for the playoffs, along with the top three teams from Group B.

First round

Placing round

Playoffs

Quarterfinals

Semifinals

Final

External links
Season on hockeyarchives.info

Austrian National League
2010–11 in Austrian ice hockey leagues
Austrian National League seasons